Oliver (died after December 1262) was a Hungarian prelate in the 13th century, who served as Bishop of Syrmia from 1250 to 1262. He resigned due to poor health and joined the Franciscans.

Career
Oliver first appeared as Bishop of Syrmia in a contemporary document on 6 November 1250, when donated the village of Dras (Drasch) to Lawrence Becsegergely, the provost of Szenternye (present-day a borough of Sremska Mitrovica, Serbia). Oliver's name was involved in the list of barons and prelates in the royal charter of Béla IV of Hungary, issued on 28 June 1254.

Oliver intended to resign from his position and join the Franciscan Order due to his poor health and "severe fatigue of his body" in 1262. As a result, he sent his two clergymen, treasurer Thomas and canon Peter to the Roman Curia to ask for his acquittal from Pope Urban IV. In response, the pope wrote a letter to Oliver's metropolitan, Archbishop Smaragd of Kalocsa in December 1262, and ordered him to investigate the circumstances and if he sees fit, accept the resignation of Oliver, absolve him from the obligation to govern the diocese and allow him to join the Franciscan monks. The cathedral chapter of Syrmia already elected John as his successor in December 1262. Oliver retired and became a Franciscan friar. His place and date of death are unknown.

References

Sources 

 
 
 

13th-century Hungarian people
13th-century Roman Catholic bishops in Hungary
Hungarian Franciscans
Roman Catholic Bishops of Syrmia